Kirsty McGuinness (born 4 November 1994) is a Northern Irish women's association football player and GAA player. She plays football for Cliftonville Ladies and the Northern Ireland women's national football team. She plays Gaelic games for Antrim GAA.

Club career
McGuinness, who is left-footed, started playing women's football when she was 14 and was chosen by the Linfield secretary to join them. In 2012, she crossed the Belfast's Big Two divide by joining Linfield's Belfast rivals Glentoran Belfast United. McGuinness helped Glentoran to a Women's Premiership and IFA Women's Challenge Cup double in her first season. However she rejoined Linfield after a season despite alleged interest from English club Arsenal Ladies.

In August 2020 Sion Swifts announced the double signing of Kirsty McGuinness and her sister Caitlin McGuinness, both from Linfield.

International career
In July 2010, she made her debut for the senior Northern Ireland women's national football team in a 3–0 win over Estonia. She was 15 years and 262 days old. In November 2011 she scored in a shock 3–1 win over Norway at Mourneview Park. She had previously played for the Northern Ireland women's national under-19 football team and at under-17s level.

Gaelic games
McGuinness also plays ladies' Gaelic football for Antrim GAA. In 2012, she was a part of the Antrim team that won the All-Ireland Junior Ladies' Football Championship. She also represented them in the Ulster Women's Intermediate Championship. She is among a small number of sportswomen who have played association football for Northern Ireland and GAA for Antrim. This differed from men's sport where there are traditionally sectarian divides between the historically majority Protestant association football and historically majority Roman Catholic GAA, which is no longer commonplace in women's sport in Northern Ireland. McGuinness would attend Linfield training wearing an Antrim shirt and vice versa. She is a Celtic F.C. supporter and admits she prefers football over Gaelic games.

References

1994 births
Living people
Northern Ireland women's international footballers
Women's association footballers not categorized by position
Women's association footballers from Northern Ireland
Antrim ladies' Gaelic footballers
Ladies' Gaelic footballers who switched code
Sion Swifts Ladies F.C. players
Women's Premiership (Northern Ireland) players
Linfield Ladies F.C. players
Glentoran W.F.C. players
UEFA Women's Euro 2022 players